Putrajaya Wetlands Park in Putrajaya, Malaysia is the largest constructed freshwater wetlands in the tropics. It is the first man-made wetland in Malaysia, which includes a Wetland Park (138 hectares) and the wetland areas (1977 hectares).

Putrajaya Wetlands consists of 24 wetland cells, Wetlands Park (Taman Wetland) and the other Wetlands areas. The Wetland now is also a wildlife sanctuary which attracts a huge variety of animals to the combined terrestrial-aquatic wetland environment.

Several species of local marshland birds and water birds including the little egret, the little green heron and cinnamon bittern, and migratory birds form Northern Hemisphere have been spotted there. Binoculars will come in handy for bird watching. The visitors can also enjoy a leisurely walk, jog or cycle along its bicycle track.

See also
 List of tourist attractions in Putrajaya

References

Wetlands of Malaysia
Tourist attractions in Putrajaya
Protected areas of Malaysia